The Perissomasticinae are a subfamily of moth of the family Tineidae.
They mostly have glossy, uniformly coloured or bicoulourd forewings and short labial palps.

Genera
 Cylicobathra
 Ectabola
 Edosa
 Hyperbola
 Neoepiscardia
 Perissomastix
 Phalloscardia
 Theatrochora

References